Sir Walter Lawry Buller  (9 October 1838 – 19 July 1906) was a New Zealand lawyer and naturalist who was a dominant figure in New Zealand ornithology. His book, A History of the Birds of New Zealand, first published in 1873, was published as an enlarged version in 1888 and became a New Zealand classic.

Biography
Buller was born at Newark, the Wesleyan mission at Pakanae in the Hokianga, the son of Rev. James Buller, a Cornish missionary who had helped convert the people of Tonga to Methodism. He was educated at Wesley College in Auckland. In 1854, he moved to Wellington with his parents, where he was befriended by the naturalist William John Swainson. In 1859 he was made Native Commissioner for the Southern Provinces. In 1871 he travelled to England and was called to the bar at the Inner Temple. Three years later he returned to Wellington and practised law.

In 1862, he married Charlotte Mair at Whangārei. They were to have four children.

Buller was the author of A History of the Birds of New Zealand (1872–1873, 2nd ed. 1887–1888), with illustrations by John Gerrard Keulemans and Henrik Grönvold. In 1882 he produced the Manual of the Birds of New Zealand as a cheaper popular alternative. In 1905, he published a two-volume Supplement to the History of the Birds of New Zealand, which brought the work up to date.

Buller was appointed Companion of the Most Distinguished Order of St Michael and St George in 1875. In November 1886, he was promoted to Knight Commander. Buller helped establish the scientific display in the New Zealand Court at the World's Fair in Paris and was decorated with the Officer of the Legion of Honour by the President of France in November 1889.

He had several unsuccessful attempts at entering Parliament as a Liberal.

He emigrated to England and died at Fleet in Hampshire on 19 July 1906.

Wellington playwright Nick Blake authored a play on Buller's life, Dr Buller's Birds, which had its debut at the 2006 NZ International Arts Festival.

List of honours
  KCMG
  Officier de la Légion d'Honneur (France)
  Officier de la Palmes académiques (France)

Eponyms
Species named after Walter Buller include Thalassarche bulleri (Buller's albatross) and Puffinus bulleri (Buller's shearwater).

References

External links

New Zealand National Library Sir Walter lawry Buller
Encyclopaedia of New Zealand 1966: Sir Walter Lawry Buller
Illustrations from History of the birds of New Zealand (1873 edn.)
Illustrations from the Supplement to the second edn. of History of the birds of New Zealand

1838 births
1906 deaths
19th-century New Zealand lawyers
New Zealand ornithologists
Cornish Methodists
People from the Hokianga
New Zealand Fellows of the Royal Society
New Zealand Knights Commander of the Order of St Michael and St George
Officiers of the Légion d'honneur
New Zealand recipients of the Légion d'honneur
Officiers of the Ordre des Palmes Académiques
People educated at Wesley College, Auckland
Sheriffs of New Zealand